Leonard Henry Courtney, 1st Baron Courtney of Penwith  (6 July 183211 May 1918) was a radical British politician, and an academic, who became famous after being advocate of proportional representation in Parliament and acting as an opponent of imperialism and militarism.

He was a member of William Ewart Gladstone's second administration from 1880 to 1883 and served as Chairman of Ways and Means (Deputy Speaker of the House of Commons) between 1886 and 1893. He was the first and the last Baron Courtney of Penwith.

Background and education
Courtney was born at Penzance, Cornwall. He was the eldest son of John Sampson Courtney, a banker, and Sarah, daughter of John Mortimer. Two of his brothers, John Mortimer Courtney (1838–1920), and William Prideaux Courtney (1845–1913), also attained public distinction, the former in the government service in Canada (from 1869, retiring in 1906), rising to be deputy-minister of finance, and the latter in the British civil service (1865–1892), and as a prominent man of letters and bibliographer. He was educated at St John's College, Cambridge, where he was Second Wrangler and first Smith's prizeman, and elected a fellow of his college. He was called to the Bar at Lincoln's Inn in 1858. From 1872 to 1875 he was professor of political economy at University College, London. He was president of the Royal Geological Society of Cornwall from 1881 to 1882.

Political career
In December 1876, after a previous unsuccessful attempt, Courtney was elected to parliament for Liskeard as a Liberal. He continued to represent the borough, and Bodmin into which it was merged by the Reform Act of 1885, until 1900, when his attitude towards the South African War (he and his wife Catherine were one of the foremost of the so-called Pro-Boer Party) compelled his retirement.

Until 1885, he was a devoted adherent of William Ewart Gladstone, particularly in finance and foreign affairs. In 1880 he was appointed Under-Secretary of State for the Home Department, in 1881 Under-Secretary of State for the Colonies and in 1882 Financial Secretary to the Treasury. He was known as a stubborn fighter for principle, and after finding that the government's Reform Bill in 1884 contained no recognition of the scheme for proportional representation, to which he was deeply committed, he resigned office. He refused to support Gladstone's Home Rule Bill in 1886 and was one of those who chiefly contributed to its rejection, whose reputation for unbending integrity and intellectual eminence gave solidity to the Liberal Unionist party.

In 1886, Courtney was elected Chairman of Ways and Means (Deputy Speaker of the House of Commons) and was sworn of the Privy Council in 1889. His efficiency in this office seemed to mark him out for the speakership after the 1895 general election. A Liberal Unionist, however, could be elected only by Conservative votes, and he had made himself objectionable to a large section of the Conservative Party by his independent attitude on various questions, on which his liberalism outweighed his party loyalty. He, would in any case, have been incapacitated by an affection of the eyesight, which for a while threatened to withdraw him from public life altogether.

After 1895, Courtney's divergences from the Unionist party on questions other than Irish politics became gradually more marked. He became known in the House of Commons principally for his candid criticism of the measures introduced by his nominal leaders, and he was rather to be ranked among the Opposition than as a Ministerialist. When the crisis with the Transvaal came in 1899, Courtney's views, which remained substantially what they were when he supported the settlement after Majuba in 1881, had plainly become incompatible with his position even as a nominal follower of Lord Salisbury and Joseph Chamberlain. 

He led the work of the South African Conciliation Committee which brought the sufferings of the Boers to the attention of British people.

In November 1902, he was appointed chairman of the Royal Commission on Superannuation of the Civil Service, which delivered their report the following year.

He gradually reverted to formal membership of the Liberal party and, in January 1906, unsuccessfully contested Edinburgh West as a supporter of Sir Henry Campbell-Bannerman at the general election. Among the birthday honours of 1906 he was elevated to the peerage as Baron Courtney of Penwith, in the County of Cornwall.

Courtney was a prominent supporter of the women's movement through the influence of his wife and sister-in-law. In his earlier years, he was a regular contributor to The Times, and he wrote numerous essays in the principal reviews on political and economic subjects. In 1901, he published a book on The Working Constitution of the United Kingdom. He was President of the Royal Statistical Society, 1897–99. He was a great friend of artist Norman Garstin.

Personal life

Courtney married Catherine Potter, daughter of Richard Potter and an elder sister of Beatrice Webb, on 15 March 1883 at St Jude's Church, Whitechapel. They had no children.

In May 1918, aged 85, he was living at 15 Cheyne Walk at the time of his death. He left effects totalling £56,672 2s 6d. The peerage became extinct.

Gallery

Arms

References

Attribution

External links

 
 
 Catalogue of the Courtney papers at the Archives Division of the London School of Economics.
 Portrait

1832 births
1918 deaths
Alumni of St John's College, Cambridge
Courtney of Penwith, Leonard Henry Courtney, 1st Baron
Politicians from Cornwall
Liberal Unionist Party MPs for English constituencies
Liberal Party (UK) MPs for English constituencies
Members of the Privy Council of the United Kingdom
Members of the Parliament of the United Kingdom for Liskeard
People from Penzance
Presidents of the Royal Statistical Society
UK MPs 1874–1880
UK MPs 1880–1885
UK MPs 1885–1886
UK MPs 1886–1892
UK MPs 1892–1895
UK MPs 1895–1900
UK MPs who were granted peerages
Second Wranglers
Presidents of the Royal Geological Society of Cornwall
Members of Lincoln's Inn
Academics of University College London
Members of the Parliament of the United Kingdom for Bodmin
Peers created by Edward VII